The Siege of Tripoli (1102–1109) took place in the aftermath of the First Crusade and led to the establishment of the fourth crusader state, the County of Tripoli, in Lebanon.

Siege of Tripoli or Battle of Tripoli may also refer to:

In Tripoli, Lebanon
 Siege of Tripoli (1271), siege of the Crusader stronghold, by the Egyptian Mamluks
 Fall of Tripoli (1289), capture of the Crusader territory, by the Mamluks
 Battle of Tripoli (1983), part of the Lebanese Civil War
 2007 Lebanon conflict, at a Palestinian refugee camp near Tripoli, Lebanon

In Tripoli, Libya
 Siege of Tripoli (1551), Ottoman Siege of Tripoli, Libya in 1551 from the Knights of St. John
 First Barbary War (1801–1805), also known as Tripolitan War
 First Battle of Tripoli Harbor (1802)
 Second Battle of Tripoli Harbor (1804)
 Battle of Tripoli (1825), defeat of Tripolitians by Sardinia
 Battle of Tripoli (1911), of the Italo-Turkish War
 Tripoli protests and clashes (February 2011), part of the Libyan civil war
 Battle of Tripoli (2011), decisive battle of the Libyan civil war resulting in the capture of Tripoli by Qatari and rebel Libyan forces
 Battle of Tripoli (2018), a series of clashes during the second Libyan civil war
 2019–20 Western Libya campaign, an offensive involving clashes on the outskirts of Tripoli

See also
 Amr ibn al-As#Expeditions in Cyrenaica and Tripolitania, including a siege of Tripoli, Libya c.643.